The name Adolph was used for four tropical cyclones in the Eastern Pacific Ocean.
 Hurricane Adolph (1983), passed close to Mazatlán, Mexico
 Tropical Storm Adolph (1989), stayed far from land
 Hurricane Adolph (1995), neared the Mexican coast but turned away
 Hurricane Adolph (2001), the second most intense May hurricane on record in the Eastern Pacific Ocean. 

The name Adolph was removed during the 2001 season due to concern that future use of the name would be politically insensitive; it was replaced by Alvin in the 2007 season.

Pacific hurricane set index articles